Paul Matthew Ridgway (born 13 February 1977) is a former English cricketer.  Ridgway is a right-handed batsman who bowls right-arm fast-medium.  He was born at Airedale, Yorkshire.

Ridgway made his first-class debut for Lancashire against Kent at Old Trafford in the 1997 County Championship.  He made just four further first-class appearances for the county, the last of which came against Warwickshire at the Trafalgar Road Ground, Southport in the 1999 County Championship.  In his five first-class appearances, he scored a total of 48 runs at an average of 12.00, with a high score of 35.  With the ball, he took 6 wickets at a bowling average of 50.16, with best figures of 3/51.

Outside of the first-class game he played club cricket for East Lancashire and Enfield in the Lancashire League.

References

External links
Paul Ridgway at ESPNcricinfo

1977 births
Living people
Cricketers from Castleford
English cricketers
Lancashire cricketers
English cricketers of 1969 to 2000